Macrenches is a genus of moth in the family Gelechiidae.

Species
 Macrenches clerica (Rosenstock, 1885)
 Macrenches eurybatis Meyrick, 1904

References

Thiotrichinae